John Miller (born 29 June 1941) is an English professional wrestling authority figure and retired professional wrestler. He is currently signed to WWE, where he served as the on-screen general manager of the now defunct NXT UK under his career-long ring name Johnny Saint.

Early career
John Miller was born in Failsworth on 29 June 1941. After finishing school at the age of 15, he followed in his father's footsteps and became a factory worker. By this time, he was already an amateur boxer. One day, his mother went to the hair salon, where she had her hair cut by Billy Robinson's mother; they became friends and introduced their sons to each other, with Miller soon beginning to train at Robinson's father's gym. He trained as a wrestler under Robinson, Colin McDonald, and George Kidd.

Career
Under the Johnny Saint ring name, Miller debuted as a professional wrestler in June 1958, being defeated by Colin McDonald. In May 1971 he won the British Lightweight Championship from Zoltan Boscik but lost it to Jim Breaks in August that year.  On 5 May 1973, he wrestled Breaks for the title, but lost in the fifth round due to referee stoppage after a cut on his forehead. On 3 November 1976, he won his first World Lightweight title, winning a tournament after the title was vacated by Saint's mentor George Kidd upon retirement. He would be featured on the British show World of Sport, though his technique-focused attitude to wrestling and strait-laced persona ensured he was underrated in America, which preferred larger-than-life characters.

Saint briefly lost the title and regained it from Steve Grey in 1979, Jackie Robinson in 1984, Breaks and Jon Cortez several times in 1985 and 1986, Mike "Flash" Jordan once in 1987-1988 and Grey again in 1992–1993. He also had two European Lightweight Championship reigns in 1979 and 1983. On 10 October 1996, Saint defeated Naohiro Hoshikawa at a Michinoku Pro Wrestling event in what was billed as Saint's retirement match.  but he continued to wrestle the occasional match and did not vacate the World Lightweight Championship until 2001 - it has remained vacant since that point.

On 27 November 2007, more than a decade after his retirement, Saint returned to the ring for LDN Wrestling to defeat Johnny Kidd. He wrestled a further eight matches for LDN, including two bouts against three-time LDN British Heavyweight Champion "Gentleman" Jon Ritchie, in which Saint put up a considerable fight before being defeated. He was defeated by Mike Quackenbush at Chikara's Tag World Grand Prix in 2008, losing by knockout when he did not get up from the referee's 10-count after he suffered a knee injury while performing a knee breaker.

Saint made his true American debut at Chikara's King of Trios Tournament on 27 March 2009, with Quackenbush and Jorge "Skayde" Rivera in "The Masters of a Thousand Holds" team. They would win their opening round match against Incoherence (Delirious, Hallowicked, and Frightmare) but lost their quarter-final round match against Team Uppercut (Bryan Danielson, Claudio Castagnoli, and Dave Taylor). Saint returned to Chikara on 30 July 2011, losing to Johnny Kidd in a match contested under World of Sport rules. The following day, Saint teamed with Quackenbush to defeat the team of Kidd and Colt Cabana, with Saint pinning Kidd.

Saint wrestled his last match In Italy in 2015. In March 2016, he began working as a guest trainer for WWE in their Performance Center. The following December, he announced that he was starting a six-month stint as a trainer for WWE. On 7 June 2018, it was announced that he would be the general manager of the UK division of its NXT brand.

Professional wrestling style and persona
Saint's nickname "The Man of a Thousand Holds" came from his largely submission based grappling style, frequently using wrist locks, roll-up pins, and bridges to counter his opponents' offence. He would also utilise a lady of the lake hold as his finishing move.

Personal life
Miller resides in the Welsh town of Rhyl.

Championships and accomplishments
British Championships
British Lightweight Championship (1 time)
European Lightweight Championship (2 times)
World Lightweight Championship (10 times)

References

External links
 
 
 

1941 births
Living people
People from Failsworth
English male professional wrestlers
20th-century professional wrestlers
21st-century professional wrestlers